Luis Antonio Pavez Contreras (born 25 June 1988) is a Chilean football player who plays for Coquimbo Unido as a midfielder.

Club career
For the 2023 season, he signed with Coquimbo Unido in the Chilean Primera División.

International career
He represented Chile U21 and Chile U22 at both the 2009 Toulon Tournament and 2010 Toulon Tournament, winning the 2009 edition.

Honours

Club
Unión Española
 Primera División de Chile (1): 2013 Transición
 Supercopa de Chile (1): 2013

International
Chile U21
 Toulon Tournament (1): 2009

References

External links
 
 

1988 births
Living people
Footballers from Santiago
Chilean footballers
Chilean expatriate footballers
Chile youth international footballers
Club Deportivo Palestino footballers
Rangers de Talca footballers
Colo-Colo footballers
Cobresal footballers
Unión Española footballers
Ñublense footballers
Coquimbo Unido footballers
Potros UAEM footballers
Club Celaya footballers
Chilean Primera División players
Segunda División Profesional de Chile players
Primera B de Chile players
Ascenso MX players
Expatriate footballers in Mexico
Chilean expatriate sportspeople in Mexico
Association football midfielders